X-tra Naked is a studio album released by Jamaican dancehall musician Shabba Ranks. It is possibly his most successful release. In 1993, the album won the Grammy Award for Best Reggae Album.

Track listing
 Ting-A-Ling - 3:52
 Slow and Sexy (Featuring Johnny Gill) - 5:18
 Will Power - 3:35
 Muscle Grip - 4:01
 Rude Boy - 3:54
 Cocky Rim - 3:37
 What'cha Gonna Do? (Featuring Queen Latifah) - 3:50
 Bedroom Bully - 4:13
 Another One Program - 3:39
 Ready-Ready, Goody-Goody - 4:07
 Two Breddrens (Featuring Chubb Rock) - 4:25
 5-F Man - 4:14
 Mr. Loverman (With Chevelle Franklyn) - 5:58

References 

1992 albums
Shabba Ranks albums
Grammy Award for Best Reggae Album
Epic Records albums